Isometry, in mathematics, refers to a distance-preserving transformation. Isometry may also refer to:

 Isometry (quadratic forms)
 Isometry (Riemannian geometry)
 Isometry group
 Quasi-isometry
 Dade isometry
 Euclidean isometry
 Euclidean plane isometry
 Itō isometry

See also
 Isometric (disambiguation)
 Isometries in physics